"Birthday" is a song written and recorded by Icelandic band the Sugarcubes. It was released as a single in 1987, and included in their 1988 debut album Life's Too Good. It was their first international single and the first single released from the album. The Icelandic version, "Ammæli", was released on the Iceland-only single "Einn Mol'á Mann (One Cube Per Head)" the previous year and was included as the B-side on the international single.

After "Birthday" became the single of the week in Melody Maker magazine and NME in August 1987, and was selected as number one in John Peel's Festive Fifty list, the band attained worldwide recognition and success. In the United Kingdom, the song was the group's first chart entry at number 65 and also reached number two on the country's indie charts. In the US it was ranked at number 15 on The Village Voices "Pazz & Jop" critics' annual year-end poll to find the best music of 1988. The Sugarcubes performed the song, along with "Motorcrash" on Saturday Night Live during the 15 October 1988 episode, which was hosted by Matthew Broderick.

Accolades
The information regarding accolades attributed to Birthday is adapted from Acclaimed Music.

Track listing 
UK 7" vinyl

Side A
 "Birthday" – 03:58
Side B
 "Birthday" (Icelandic) – 03:57
UK 12" vinyl

Side A
 "Birthday" – 03:58
 "Birthday" (Icelandic) – 03:57
Side B
 "Cat" (Icelandic) – 02:56
UK CD
 "Birthday" – 3:58
 "Motorcrash" – 02:23
 "Cat" (Icelandic) – 02:56
 "Birthday" (Icelandic) – 03:57

Remixes 
The song was remixed in 1988 by Jim and William Reid of The Jesus and Mary Chain and reissued as "Birthday (The Christmas Mixes)".

Remixes by Justin Robertson and Tommy D were produced in 1992 for the compilation It's-It, and were also released as a single.

Covers 
A cover of this song has been recorded by Chitose Hajime in 2001. It has also been covered by The Mars Volta in 2008.
Jackie Oates also recorded this song on her 2009 album Hyperboreans (One Little Indian). M. Ward released a cover of this song in 2021.

Legacy 
In the Xiu Xiu song "Dr. Troll" (from Knife Play), Jamie Stewart sings "listen to Birthday and pretend someone could love you".

Charts

References

External links 

1987 singles
Songs about birthday parties
Songs about birthdays
UK Independent Singles Chart number-one singles